Badiyeh-ye Yek (also Romanized as Bādīyeh-ye Yek and Bādīyeh Yek; also known as Bādeyeh and Bādīyeh) is a village in Dehpir-e Shomali Rural District, in the Central District of Khorramabad County, Lorestan Province, Iran. At the 2006 census, its population was 31, in 8 families.

References 

Towns and villages in Khorramabad County